The Laws of the Universe (Japanese: UFO学園の秘密 Hepburn: UFO Gakuen no Himitsu) is a Japanese animated film series consisting of four films, produced by HS Pictures Studio. The first film in the series, titled The Laws of the Universe: Part 0, was released on October 10, 2015. The anime has been licensed by Eleven Arts.

Plot
A group of five junior high school students are wrapped up in a strange occurrence, involving an alien species called Grey.

Cast

Production
A promotional video of the prologue, The Laws of the Universe: Part 0, first streamed on July 23, 2015. The movie series was produced by HS Pictures Studio, which is operated by Happy Science, a controversial new religious and spiritual movement. Ryuho Okawa, the founder of Happy Science, was reported to be directly overseeing production of the movie series. A sequel to Part 0, The Laws of the Universe Part 1, premiered at the Awareness Film Festival in Los Angeles on October 6, 2018.

Reception
The Laws of the Universe: Part 0 was critically panned by anime critics. Charles Solomon of Los Angeles Times described the movie as "messy", and that "it follows no rules". Solomon also commented that the movie is something only Okawa followers could enjoy.

References

External links
Official website (Japanese)

Japanese animated science fiction films
Japanese film series
Film series introduced in 2015